Charles Hommer DeArmond (February 13, 1877 – December 17, 1933) was a Major League Baseball third baseman. He played for the 1903 Cincinnati Reds. DeArmond died of lobar pneumonia, and is buried in Shandon, Ohio.

References

External links
Baseball Reference page

1877 births
1933 deaths
Cincinnati Reds players
Major League Baseball third basemen
Baseball players from Ohio
People from Butler County, Ohio
Florence Fiddlers players